is a Japanese professional baseball pitcher for the Yokohama DeNA BayStars of the Nippon Professional Baseball (NPB).

Career
In 2015 NPB draft, Yokohama DeNA BayStars selected him in the first round.

Imanaga signed with the Canberra Cavalry of the Australian Baseball League to play weeks 2-7 of the 2018–19 Australian Baseball League season

In his six starts for the Cavalry, he posted a 4-0 record with a league best 0.51 ERA over 35 innings with a ridiculous 57 strikeouts to just one walk. By meeting the statistical recognition minimum (0.8IP per team game), Imanaga broke the league records for WHIP (0.429), H/9 (3.6), BB/9 (0.3) and second best ERA behind Ryan Searle.

Following his successful ABL stint, Imanaga posted a 13-7 2.91 ERA, 2019 Nippon Professional Baseball season, finishing second in wins and strikeouts only behind Shun Yamaguchi in the Central League.

Imanaga pitched a no-hitter on June 7, 2022.

International career 
Imanaga represented the Japan national baseball team in the 2019 exhibition games against Mexico and 2019 WBSC Premier12.

On February 27, 2019, he was selected at the 2019 exhibition games against Mexico.

On October 1, 2019, he was selected to Team Japan for the 2019 WBSC Premier12.

References

External links

 NPB.com

1993 births
Living people
Canberra Cavalry players
Komazawa University alumni
Nippon Professional Baseball pitchers
Baseball people from Kitakyushu
Yokohama DeNA BayStars players
2019 WBSC Premier12 players
2023 World Baseball Classic players
Japanese expatriate baseball players in Australia